Avinash Dharmadhikari is a former Indian Administrative Services officer. He was a well known social activist and free-lance journalist before joining IAS.After serving on various posts during his administrative career of ten years he resigned from IAS in 1996 for the reason that can be best described in Arun Shourie's words "to be able to serve Indian society better". He was Deputy Secretary to the Chief Minister of Maharashtra at the time of his resignation. He is founder and director of Chanakya Mandal Pariwar, working in the field of Career Guidance and Personality Development. He unsuccessfully contested for Lok Sabha as an independent candidate against Suresh Kalmadi. He was Director General of Neharu Yuva Kendra Sangathan in 2001 under Ministry of Sports and Youth Affairs, Government of India.  As a social activist he has been part of many movements such as farmers' movements and movements against corruption. He was also a part of Team Anna during India against corruption movement. 
He has authored many books which includes Aswastha Dashakachi Diary, Nava Vijaypath, Ek Vijaypath, Swatantra Nagarik, Jinkanara Samaj Ghadawanari Shikshanpadhhati, Aani Aapan Saglech, Ratra Gahirichya Tisarya Prahari(a collection of poems) . Aswastha Dashakachi Diary has been translated into English by Gauri Deshpande titled: Diary of a Decade of Agony.

Administrative career

In his administrative career he had been known for his efficient, transparent and creative work in Maharashtra. During these ten years he had served on many posts such as – Sub-Divisional officer, Phaltan; Officer on Special Duty for state's Chief Secretary; Director, State Archives, Mumbai; CEO at Ratnagiri and Amaravati zilla parishads; Additional Collector, Pune; Director, Women and Child Welfare Dept, Maharashtra; District Collector, Raigad (Alibag); Deputy Secretary to Chief Minister, Maharashtra.

Aftermath of administrative career
 
 

After resigning from IAS in 1996, he founded Chanakya Mandal Pariwar, a network organization working in the field of Career Guidance, Competitive Exam (Civil Services Examination) Training, Entrepreneurship Building and Personality Development. It was the disappointment he felt for being the only one from Maharashtra to get selected for the Civil Services in 1986, along with rampant corruption and apathy among the civil servants towards issues of the common man that led him to found the CMP in 1996, with a motive to send honest and efficient cadres to the services and contribute in the nation building in his own way.

On 31 December 2014, the 14th Dalai Lama inaugurated a new building of Chanakya Mandal Pariwar and lauded Avinash Dharmadhikari's commitment to serve nation through youth education.

Working as the Director General of Neharu Yuva Kendra Sangathan in 2001 under Ministry of Sports and Youth Affairs, Government of India, he initiated some major programs to encourage youths to join sports.
He was a Shiv Sena member between March 2009 and April 2011.

In November 2012 he joined Team Anna that led a revolutionary India Against Corruption movement against the then UPA-II government and proposed Jan Lokpal Bill along with former IPS Kiran Bedi, Justice (Rtd) Santosh Hegde, Activist Medha Patkar, former Army Chief Gen Vijay Kumar Singh, former DGP(Punjab) Shashikant, Lt Col Brijendra Khokhar, Akhil Gogoi, Sunita Godara, Arvind Gaur, Rakesh Rafiq when Arvind Kejriwal, Yogendra Yadav and some other members separated from Anna Hazare to form a political party.

References

Indian Administrative Service officers
1959 births
Living people